Brooklyn Shuck (born March 29, 2005) is an American actress best known for her role as Lynn Bouchard in the CBS/Paramount+ supernatural drama series Evil (2019–present).

Career
Brooklyn Shuck is an actress known for her numerous Broadway roles. Shuck was first cast as an understudy for Molly, Kate, Tessie, July and Duffy, in Annie. She would later go on to replace Tyrah Skye Odoms in the role of Kate on July 30, 2013.

Following her role in Annie she played the title role in Matilda the Musical on Broadway in 2014 before departing in early 2015 to play little Bertie/Nina in the Chicago tryout of the musical adaptation of Iris Rainer Dart's novel Beaches.

She has since played many other Broadway roles including Winnie Foster in Tuck Everlasting (understudy; 2016), Little Cosette in Les Miserables (understudy; 2016), Little Lily Potter in Harry Potter and the Cursed Child (2018), and most recently Nunu Carney in The Ferryman (2018). Shuck has also played the role of Sadie Mazzuchelli in the NBC show Rise.

Shuck currently (as of 2021) plays Lynn Bouchard in the CBS/Paramount+ TV series Evil.

Personal life
Shuck was born to Angie and T.G. Shuck in Lexington, Kentucky on March 29, 2005.

Shuck is the middle child with two sisters, Sydney and Raleigh who are both actors seen in Broadway national tours. In 2012 Shuck and her family moved to New York City and have lived there ever since.

Shuck is also involved with many charitable causes including Broadway Cares/Equity Fights AIDS (BCEFA).

Credits

Theatre

Television

References

External links
 
 
  (archive)

Actresses from Kentucky
Actors from Lexington, Kentucky
American child actresses
Living people
2005 births
21st-century American actresses
American stage actresses